GA, Ga, or ga may refer to:

Organisations

Businesses
 Garuda Indonesia (IATA airline code GA)
 General Assembly, a digital and technology training company
 General Atlantic, a private equity company
 General Atomics (formerly GA Technologies Inc.), a U.S. defense contractor
 General Automation, a former computer manufacturer
 Georgia Railroad and Banking Company (AAR mark)

Other organizations
 Gamblers Anonymous, a support group for recovering gamblers
  or Young Patriots, the youth organization of Eusko Alkartasuna
 General assembly (disambiguation)
 United Nations General Assembly, the main deliberative organ of the United Nations
 Geographical Association, a UK organisation dedicated to the teaching of geography
 Geologists' Association, a UK organisation dedicated to the study of geology
Geoscience Australia, an Australian organisation dedicated to geoscientific research
Germantown Academy, an independent school in Fort Washington, United States
 Government Arsenal, an agency of the Philippine government under the Department of National Defence

Linguistics

Languages and dialects
 Ga language
 Irish language (ISO 639-1 code "ga")
 General American, an accent of the Midwestern US

Characters
 Ga (Indic), a glyph in the Brahmic family of script
 Ga (Javanese) (ꦒ), a letter in the Javanese script
 Ga (kana), in Japanese

Places

Africa
 Ga District, Ghana, a former district of southern Ghana
 Gã State, a traditional state in southern Ghana headed by the Gã Mantse 
 Ga-Rankuwa, a town in South Africa
 Gabon (ISO 3166-1 alpha-2 code)
 The Gambia (FIPS 10-4 country code)

Other places
 Goa, in India (ISO 3166-2 country subdivision code GA)
 Georgia (U.S. state) (postal abbreviation GA)

Science and technology

Biology and medicine
 General anaesthesia, administration of drugs to induce unconsciousness prior to surgery
 Gestational age (obstetrics), in pregnancy, the time since onset of last menstrual period
 Embryonic age or gestational age, the length of gestation since fertilization
 Gibberellin, a plant growth hormone
 Tabun (nerve agent) (NATO designation GA)

Computing
 .ga, the country code top-level domain for Gabon
 General availability, the final stage in the software development lifecycle
 Genetic algorithm, an optimization technique in computer science
 Google Analytics, a web analytics service provided by Google

Other uses in science and technology
 Gallium (symbol Ga), a chemical element
 General aviation, the category of civil aviation encompassing all non-scheduled aircraft flights
 Geometric algebra, a Clifford algebra used in a geometric context
 Gigaampere (GA), an SI unit of electric current equal to 1,000,000,000 (one billion) amps
 Gigaannum (Ga), a unit of time equal to 1,000,000,000 (one billion) years.
 Go Ahead, in a telecommunications device for the deaf

Sport
 Goal attack, a position in netball
 Goals against, a statistic in ice hockey and other sports

Other uses
 GA Geijutsuka Art Design Class, an ongoing 2004 manga series by Satoko Kiyuzuki
 Gandhara or Ga, a basic note of the scale in Indian music, or Svara
 Ga people, an ethnic group of Ghana
 General of the Army, a military rank
 Global affairs, abbreviated GA, alternative term for International relations, the study of politics, economics and law on a global level 
 Graduate assistant, a role in academia and in U.S. college sports

Language and nationality disambiguation pages